American Ruse was a 5 piece Rock 'n' roll band from Oklahoma City, Oklahoma. They formed in 2003 and have opened for Fu Manchu, The Riverboat Gamblers, The Black Halos and Nebula. Their tracks have been featured in 411 Video Magazine #66 and appear on Flattery: a tribute to Radio Birdman. American Ruse disbanded in 2005. Some members went on to form Los Hijos Del Diablo

Discography
American Ruse - Self Titled
recorded in 2004 by Stephen Egeraton
Flattery: A tribute to Radio Birdman Volume 3
Do the Pop

External links
Official Website
American Ruse Official MySpace

References

Musicians from Oklahoma City
Musical groups from Oklahoma